The XIV Eläintarhajot was a non-championship Formula One motor race held at Eläintarha, Helsinki on 11 May 1952. The race was won by Roger Laurent in a Talbot-Lago T26C by just one tenth of a second from Erik Lundgren.

Results

References

Eläintarhanajot
Eläintarhanajot
Eläintarhanajot